APRA Rebelde was a splinter group of the Peruvian APRA. APRA Rebelde was formed in 1959, by a group that was expelled from APRA at a National Congress on October 12. The leader of the group, APRA Rebelde started orienting itself towards the radical Marxist left. In 1962 the group was refounded as the Revolutionary Left Movement (MIR).

1959 establishments in Peru
1962 disestablishments in Peru
Defunct political parties in Peru
Political parties disestablished in 1962
Political parties established in 1959
Socialist parties in Peru